The Houston Astros' 1982 season was a season in American baseball. It involved the Houston Astros attempting to win the National League West.

Offseason 
 October 23, 1981: Pete Ladd was traded by the Astros to the Milwaukee Brewers for Rickey Keeton.
 December 18, 1981: César Cedeño was traded by the Astros to the Cincinnati Reds for Ray Knight.

Regular season

Season standings

Record vs. opponents

Notable transactions 
 June 8, 1982: Joe Pittman was traded by the Astros to the San Diego Padres for Danny Boone
 August 30, 1982: Don Sutton was traded by the Astros to the Milwaukee Brewers for players to be named later and cash.
 September 3, 1982: The Brewers completed their August 30 trade with the Astros, sending Kevin Bass, Frank DiPino, and Mike Madden to the Astros.

Roster

Player stats

Batting

Starters by position 
Note: Pos = Position; G = Games played; AB = At bats; H = Hits; Avg. = Batting average; HR = Home runs; RBI = Runs batted in

Other batters 
Note: G = Games played; AB = At bats; H = Hits; Avg. = Batting average; HR = Home runs; RBI = Runs batted in

Pitching

Starting pitchers 
Note: G = Games pitched; IP = Innings pitched; W = Wins; L = Losses; ERA = Earned run average; SO = Strikeouts

Other pitchers 
Note: G = Games pitched; IP = Innings pitched; W = Wins; L = Losses; ERA = Earned run average; SO = Strikeouts

Relief pitchers 
Note: G = Games pitched; W = Wins; L = Losses; SV = Saves; ERA = Earned run average; SO = Strikeouts

Farm system

References

External links
1982 Houston Astros season at Baseball Reference

Houston Astros seasons
1982 Major League Baseball season
Houston